The Centre scolaire Samuel-de-Champlain is the only Francophone school in Saint John, New Brunswick. But there is a K to 5 located in Quispamsis about 30 minutes away named L’École des Pionniers.

History
It is a K to 12 school. The school is named after French explorer Samuel de Champlain who named the Saint John River.

See also
 Francophone Sud School District
 List of schools in New Brunswick

References

Elementary schools in Saint John, New Brunswick
Middle schools in Saint John, New Brunswick
High schools in Saint John, New Brunswick